The National Property Board of Sweden (SFV) is a Swedish State administrative authority, organised under the Ministry of Finance.

SFV is responsible for managing a portion of the real property assets owned by the State. The portfolio consists of more than 2,300 properties, or approximately 3,000 buildings; among them a number of castles, museums, theatres, historic fortifications, ministry buildings, embassies, county residences and parks.

History 
SFV was established in 1993, after the National Board of Public Building split into several smaller units, including Akademiska Hus, Vasakronan and SFV. The agency took over the responsibility for a portion of the State's real estate portfolio; mostly property of particularly historical value, for which there was a particular need for careful long-term management.

Organisation 
The National Property Board Sweden is organised into seven units and seven property areas. The head office is located in Stockholm, and the agency is led by Director-General Björn Anderson.

See also 
 Crown palaces in Sweden

References

External links 

 The National Property Board Sweden – Official site (English)

Government agencies of Sweden
Property management
Real estate in Sweden